The E. C. Hammond House is a historic house at 35 Groveland Street in Newton, Massachusetts.  The 1 3/4 story wood-frame house was built in 1909 and designed by its owner, Edward C. Hammond, a lumberman.  The house is a simple but well-crafted and preserved example of Craftsman styling.  It has a steep gabled roof, with a pergola porch across the front of the main façade.  It retains its interior wood work and some original light fixtures.

The house was listed on the National Register of Historic Places in 1990.

See also
 National Register of Historic Places listings in Newton, Massachusetts

References

Houses on the National Register of Historic Places in Newton, Massachusetts
Houses completed in 1909